Roberto Pérez Valdez (born 25 October 19XX) is a Paraguayan football manager and former player who played as a defender. He is the current manager of Bolivian club Aurora.

Playing career
Pérez played for Newell's Old Boys and Boca Juniors in Argentina, aside from playing for Paraguayan Primera División sides. He arrived in Bolivia in 2003, and after his move to Blooming never materialized, he joined 1º de Mayo, losing in the final of the 2004 Copa Simón Bolívar with the side.

Managerial career
After retiring, Pérez remained in Bolivia and managed Deportivo LAN and Always Ready before joining Roberto Pavisic's staff at Aurora in 2015, as his assistant. In 2016, he took over the team, after Pavisic left.

Pérez achieved promotion to the Primera División with Aurora, but was replaced by Miguel Ángel Zahzú. After leaving, he worked at Universitario de Vinto.

On 18 June 2018, Pérez returned to Aurora, but resigned on 7 August. On 6 October 2020, he was appointed manager of Sur-Car, and left the club at the end of the Copa Simón Bolívar

On 15 October 2022, Pérez returned to Aurora for a third spell.

Personal life
Pérez's father, also named Roberto, was also a footballer. A goalkeeper, he played in two editions of the Copa Libertadores for Sol de América and Club Nacional. His son, also named Roberto, also plays youth football.

Honours

Manager
Aurora
Copa Simón Bolívar: 2016–17

References

External links

Living people
Paraguayan footballers
Association football defenders
Paraguayan expatriate footballers
Expatriate footballers in Bolivia
Argentine expatriate sportspeople in Bolivia
Paraguayan football managers
Bolivian Primera División managers
Club Aurora managers
Bolivian expatriate football managers
Expatriate football managers in Bolivia
Year of birth missing (living people)
F.C. Universitario de Vinto managers